The 1986 Colorado Buffaloes football team represented the University of Colorado at Boulder in the Big Eight Conference during the 1986 NCAA Division I-A football season. Led by fifth-year head coach Bill McCartney, Colorado opened with four losses, but finished the regular season at 6–5 (6–1 in Big 8, second).  It was their best conference record in a quarter century, and they were invited to the Bluebonnet Bowl in Houston on New Year's Eve.

The Buffaloes were upset 23–7 in the opener by intrastate rival Colorado State, but defeated Nebraska for the first time in nineteen years, and the first time in Boulder since 1960.

Schedule

Roster

Staff

HC: Bill McCartney

Ast: Lou Tepper (AHC/DC/ILB), Gerry DiNardo (OC/TE), Gary Barnett (QB/FB), Steve Bernstein (DB), Mike Hankwitz (OLB), Steve Logan (RB), Oliver Lucas (WR), Les Miles (OL), Ron Vanderlinden (DL)

Game summaries

Nebraska

    
    
    
    
    
    

The fans tore down the goal posts as the Buffaloes defeated Nebraska for the first time since 1967, breaking a streak of 18 losses to the Huskers, and the first win in Boulder over NU since 1960. "This is a moment in our program we'll always cherish", said Colorado head coach Bill McCartney. "Up to this point I don't think we've beaten a great team. We did today. And I think we have a rivalry now."

Oklahoma State

References

External links
Sports-Reference – 1986 Colorado Buffaloes

Colorado
Colorado Buffaloes football seasons
Colorado Buffaloes football